USS Pawnee (SP-699), later USS SP-699, formerly named Monoloa II, a wooden-hulled yacht, was built in 1904 by George Lawley & Son, Neponset, Massachusetts; purchased by the Navy on 26 June 1917 from Gordon Dexter of Beverly, Massachusetts; and commissioned on 1 July 1917.

Pawnee subsequently had her name dropped in 1918 and was listed as SP–699. She was outfitted with sweep gear and served as a section minesweeper until she decommissioned and was sold on 12 July 1921 to George E. Johnson and O. T. Ledberg of Edgewood, Rhode Island.

References

External links
 

Patrol vessels of the United States Navy
World War I patrol vessels of the United States
Minesweepers of the United States Navy
World War I minesweepers of the United States
Ships built in Boston
1904 ships